Jamaica competed at the 1992 Winter Olympics in Albertville, France. Its only representatives were the Jamaican bobsleigh team; they did not win a medal.

Competitors
The following is the list of number of competitors in the Games.

Bobsleigh

 Devon Harris (two-man pilot)
 Ricky McIntosh (four-man pusher, two-man brakeman)
 Dudley Stokes (four-man pilot, two-man pilot)
 Chris Stokes (four-man brakeman, two-man brakeman)
 Michael White (four-man pusher)

References

 Official Olympic Reports
 Olympic Winter Games 1992, full results by sports-reference.com

Nations at the 1992 Winter Olympics
1992 Winter Olympics
1992 in Jamaican sport